A big top is a large tent in which a traveling circus takes place.

Big Top may also refer to:
 Big Top (Transformers), a Transformers character
 Big Top (American TV series), a children's television series in the 1950s
 Big Top (2009 TV series), a BBC comedy series
 Big Top (video game), a 1983 computer game
 "Big Top" (Dead Zone), an episode of The Dead Zone TV series
 Bigtop Records, a record label
 Big Top (album), a 2000 album by free jazz drummer Whit Dickey
 Big Top Sydney, an entertainment and concert venue in Luna Park, Sydney